Henry Suluvale (born 16 September 1971) is a former professional rugby league footballer who represented Western Samoa at the 1995 Rugby League World Cup and also the 1995 world sevens. Suluvale played on the Wing or in the Centres.

Early years
Suluvale grew up in Christchurch, New Zealand.

Playing career
Suluvale played 22 games for the Canterbury Country Cardinals in the 1994 Lion Red Cup, scoring 18 tries. He also toured New Zealand and Fiji with Western Samoa in 1994 and represented Canterbury in their Rugby League Cup defence.

Suluvale joined Eastern Suburbs in 1995 later renamed the "Sydney City Roosters" and played mostly reserve grade before signing for Super League.

In 1996, he signed with the Hunter Mariners before the Superleague war ended the club's season before it began. He instead moved to the Gold Coast, spending two years with the Gold Coast Chargers and played 19 first grade games.  Suluvale's last game in first grade was against Parramatta in Round 8 1998 which the Gold Coast lost 24-2.

References

External links
World Cup 1995 details
Henry Suluvale at rugbyleagueproject.org

Living people
New Zealand rugby league players
Samoa national rugby league team players
Canterbury rugby league team players
Sydney Roosters players
Gold Coast Chargers players
Hunter Mariners players
People educated at Burnside High School
1971 births
Rugby league players from Christchurch
Rugby league wingers